Jamie Duursma (born 14 November 1963) is a former Australian rules footballer who played with the Sydney Swans, Brisbane Bears and Melbourne  in the Victorian Football League (VFL) during the late 1980s.

Duursma, after a stint with the Hawthorn reserves, began his career in Sydney but after two years with the Swans joined Brisbane for their inaugural VFL season. He only made one appearance in the seniors while at Brisbane and was drafted to Melbourne in 1988 where he had some success, playing as a centre half back in their losing 1988 Grand Final team. His career was hampered by knee injuries.

He later played at Sandringham, the club he was at before he joined Sydney and he was a premiership player at the Rochester Football Club in 1992.

References

Holmesby, Russell and Main, Jim (2007). The Encyclopedia of AFL Footballers. 7th ed. Melbourne: Bas Publishing.

1963 births
Living people
Australian rules footballers from Victoria (Australia)
Sydney Swans players
Brisbane Bears players
Melbourne Football Club players
Sandringham Football Club players
Rochester Football Club players